Avatha uloptera is a species of moth of the family Erebidae. It is found in Peninsular Malaysia, Thailand and on Sumatra and Borneo. The habitat consists of montane areas.

References

Moths described in 1925
Avatha
Moths of Malaysia
Moths of Asia
Moths of Indonesia